Pogobrama barbatula is a species of cyprinid fish endemic to China.  It is the only species in its genus.

References
 

Cyprinid fish of Asia
Freshwater fish of China
Fish described in 1985